Out of Order may refer to:
 Out of Order (1987 film), a 1987 British film
 Out of Order (1997 film), a 1997 Hungarian comedy film
 "Out of Order" (Curious George episode)
 Out of Order (novel), a novel by Phoebe Atwood Taylor
 Out of Order (Nuclear Assault album), 1991
 Out of Order (play), a 1990 play by Ray Cooney
 Out of Order (Rod Stewart album), 1988
Out of Order Tour
 Out of Order (miniseries), a 2003 miniseries starring Eric Stoltz and Felicity Huffman
 Out of Order (video game), a 2003 adventure video game
 Out of Order, a radio show formerly hosted by Jed the Fish
 Out of Order, a BBC radio quiz 1988-97, hosted by Patrick Hannan
 Out of Order, an outdoor installation by Scottish artist David Mach located in Kingston upon Thames, southwest London, England

See also
 not in order (disambiguation), in various senses
 Out-of-order execution, a paradigm used in high-performance microprocessors
 contrary to rules of order